The Cambridge Companion to Chomsky is a 2005 book that surveys the thought and influence of Noam Chomsky. Edited by James McGilvray and published by Cambridge University Press in their Cambridge Companions series, the book received a second edition in 2017.

References

External links 

 Second edition
 First edition

2005 non-fiction books
English-language books
Noam Chomsky
Cambridge University Press books
Essay collections